Rajkumar Rawat is an Indian politician and a member of the 16th Legislative Assembly of India. He represents the Goverdhan constituency of Uttar Pradesh and is a member of the Bahujan Samaj Party political party.

Early life and  education
Rajkumar Rawat was born in Mathura district. He is educated till twelfth grade.

Political career

Rajkumar Rawat has been a MLA for two terms. He represented the Goverdhan constituency and is a member of the Bahujan Samaj Party political party. He started his political career as Block Pramukh, Raya, Mathura in 1995. His wife Mrs. Vimlesh Rawat also became unopposed Block Pramukh of Raya in 2001. He was the first Brahmin candidate who won the Jat community dominated Gokul Constituency on the ticket of Bahujan Samaj Party in 2007.

Posts held

See also
 Goverdhan (Assembly constituency)
 Sixteenth Legislative Assembly of Uttar Pradesh
 Uttar Pradesh Legislative Assembly

References 

Bahujan Samaj Party politicians from Uttar Pradesh
Uttar Pradesh MLAs 2007–2012
Uttar Pradesh MLAs 2012–2017
People from Mathura district
1967 births
Living people